Lake McCloud is a reservoir on the McCloud River in Northern California.  The lake forms behind an earthen dam finished in 1965 by the Pacific Gas and Electric Company to control water flows and for generating hydro-electric power.  McCloud Dam (National ID # CA00416) is 235 feet high, 630 feet long at its crest, and impounds a maximum capacity of 35,200 acre-feet.

The lake is home to a population of rainbow and brown trout, due in large part to the fact that the lake water temperature stays relatively cold all year.

See also
List of dams and reservoirs in California
List of lakes in California

References

External links

Pacific Gas and Electric Company
McCloud
McCloud
Shasta-Trinity National Forest
McCloud
McCloud